Snapseed is a photo-editing application for iOS and Android that enables users to enhance photos and apply digital filters. It was created by Nik Software, and is now owned by Google.

History
Nik Software originally launched Snapseed on the iPad in June 2011, and it was named iPad App of the Year 2011 by Apple. Building on the success of the iPad version, Nik launched Snapseed for the iPhone in August 2011. Later, on February 27, 2012, Snapseed was announced for Microsoft Windows.

Subsequent to the Google take-over, Snapseed was released for Android in December 2012 and the desktop version of Snapseed was discontinued.

On April 9, 2015, Nik released Snapseed 2.0 for iOS and Android, bringing new tools, features, and a refreshed user interface.

Features
Snapseed users can edit pictures using swiping gestures to select different effects and enhancements. Alternatively, users can opt for an "automatic" adjustment of color and contrast. Snapseed can save users' editing history and redirect to any of the actions before. It can also create and save filter combinations by using the default filters and editing features. The list of special effects and filters includes Drama, Grunge, Vintage, Center-focus, Frames, and a Tilt-shift (which resizes photos). Users can import RAW images as well for better quality edits. Snapseed 2.0 introduced new filters such as lens blur, glamour glow, HDR scape and noir, while also reformatting the tools section with a clearer user interface.

Awards
Named iPad App of the Year 2011 by Apple
Named one of the Top 100 Best Android App of 2018 by PC Magazine

References

External links
 
 

Android (operating system) software
IOS software
Google software